The 42nd running of the Tour of Flanders cycling classic was held on Sunday, 30 March 1958. Belgian rider Germain Derijcke won the race in the sprint of a nine-man group in Wetteren. 61 of 153 riders finished.

Route
The race started in Ghent and finished in Wetteren – covering 230 km. The course featured four categorized climbs:
 Kwaremont
 Kruisberg
 Berg Ten Stene
 Kloosterstraat (Geraardsbergen)

Results

References

1958
1958 in road cycling
1958 in Belgian sport
1958 Challenge Desgrange-Colombo
March 1958 sports events in Europe